The Cocking affair was an attempt in 1941 by Georgia governor Eugene Talmadge to exert direct control over the state's educational system, particularly through the firing of Professor Walter Cocking because of his support for racial integration, and the subsequent removal of members of the Georgia Board of Regents who disagreed with the decision. It has been made into an opera entitled A Scholar Under Siege.

Background
Governor Talmadge's first political interference was in 1935, when he supported a 1935 bill that would have given the governor additional control over funds appropriated to the Georgia Board of Regents, transferred the titles to all Board of Regents property to the state, and absorbed any trust funds or investments held by the university system. In addition to the obvious disadvantages for the university system, this would have made it difficult or impossible to fund building projects (such as the construction of a new gym at Georgia Tech) as the state could not take on Public Works Administration (PWA) loans.

A compromise deal was reached; if the bill passed with the support of the regents, the state would provide funding to cover projects that would have been supported by PWA loans; however, Talmadge's effort to control the regents and the university system was relatively clear at the time.

Firing
Talmadge fired Walter Cocking, who was dean of the College of Education at the University of Georgia. Talmadge accused Cocking of championing integration, in this case the admission of African-American students to historically all-white educational institutions. Talmadge declared that he would fire anyone who stood for "communism or racial equality".

Consequences
As a result of the firings, all Georgia universities lost their accreditation. This incident also contributed to Talmadge's loss in the subsequent election to Ellis Arnall.

See also
 History of Georgia
 History of Georgia Tech
 Georgia Southern University
 Johns Committee

References

Works cited

Further reading
Bailes, Sue. "Eugene Talmadge and the Board Of Regents Controversy," Georgia Historical Quarterly, Winter 1969, Vol. 53 Issue 4, pp 409-423

History of education in the United States
Education in Georgia (U.S. state)
History of Georgia (U.S. state)
1941 in education
1941 in the United States
Political scandals in Georgia (U.S. state)
1941 in Georgia (U.S. state)